Alioune Diouf (born 15 November 1966) is a Senegalese wrestler. He competed at the 1992 Summer Olympics, the 1996 Summer Olympics and the 2000 Summer Olympics.

References

External links
 

1966 births
Living people
Senegalese male sport wrestlers
Olympic wrestlers of Senegal
Wrestlers at the 1992 Summer Olympics
Wrestlers at the 1996 Summer Olympics
Wrestlers at the 2000 Summer Olympics
Place of birth missing (living people)
20th-century Senegalese people
21st-century Senegalese people